The UNC Asheville Bulldogs women's basketball team is the women's basketball team that represents the University of North Carolina at Asheville in Asheville, North Carolina, United States. The school's team currently competes in the Big South Conference.

History
UNC Asheville began play in 1975. Prior to their competition in NCAA, they won the NAIA Women's Basketball Championships in 1984, 72–70 over Portland. As of the end of the 2016–17 season, they have an all-time record of 432–709. They have won the Big South title once in the regular season (2016), finished as tournament runner up in 1998 and 2005 but also have won three tournament titles (2007, 2016, 2017), making the NCAA Tournament in those three years.

Postseason results

NCAA Division I

NAIA Division I

References

External links